Eddo André Brandes (born 5 March 1963) is a former Zimbabwean cricketer who played in 10 Tests and 59 ODIs from 1987 to 1999, spanning four World Cups. In the days when a number of Zimbabwe's players were amateurs with other full-time professions, Brandes was a chicken farmer.

Early life
Brandes was born on 5 March 1963 in Port Shepstone, Natal Province, South Africa. He was the son of a German father and a South African mother. He and his family moved to Rhodesia the year after he was born and he grew up on a farming property.

International career
He took a hat-trick in an ODI against England in January 1997 that is still regarded as the highest by total average of the batsmen dismissed. Only two months short of his 34th birthday, he remains the oldest player to have taken an ODI hat-trick.

Brandes gained fame for his noted and oft-quoted exchange with Glenn McGrath. After McGrath became frustrated at being unable to dismiss him, the bowler asked: "Why are you so fat?" to which Brandes replied: "Because every time I shag your wife she gives me a chocolate biscuit."

In February 2020, he was named in Zimbabwe's squad for the Over-50s Cricket World Cup in South Africa. However, the tournament was cancelled during the third round of matches due to the coronavirus pandemic.

After cricket
As of 2003 Brandes had moved to Australia to pursue a coaching career, and was formerly coaching the Sunshine Coast Scorchers who play in the XXXX Gold Brisbane Grade Competition. As of 2009 he runs a tomato farm on the Sunshine Coast.

References

External links

1963 births
Living people
People from Port Shepstone
Alumni of Prince Edward School
Mashonaland cricketers
Zimbabwe Test cricketers
Zimbabwe One Day International cricketers
Zimbabwean cricketers
One Day International hat-trick takers
Cricketers at the 1987 Cricket World Cup
Cricketers at the 1992 Cricket World Cup
Cricketers at the 1996 Cricket World Cup
Cricketers at the 1999 Cricket World Cup
Zimbabwean cricket coaches
White Zimbabwean sportspeople
Zimbabwean emigrants to Australia
Zimbabwean people of German descent
Zimbabwean people of South African descent